The Archdiocese of Manaus is an archdiocese located in the city of Manaus in Brazil.

History
 April 27, 1892: Established as Diocese of Amazonas from the Diocese of Belém do Pará
 February 16, 1952: Promoted as Metropolitan Archdiocese of Manaus

Bishops

Ordinaries, in reverse chronological order
 Archbishops of Manaus
 Leonardo Ulrich Steiner, O.F.M. (2019.12.27 – present)
 Sergio Eduardo Castriani (2012.12.12 - 2019.11.27)
 Luiz Soares Vieira (1991.11.13 – 2012.12.12)
 Clóvis Frainer, O.F.M. Cap. (1985.01.05 – 1991.05.22), appointed Archbishop of Juiz de Fora, Minas Gerais
 Milton Corrêa Pereira (1981.03.05 – 1984.05.23)
 Milton Corrêa Pereira (Apostolic Administrator 1980.04.21 – 1981.03.05)
 João de Souza Lima (1958.01.16 – 1980.04.21)
 Alberto Gaudêncio Ramos (1952.02.16 – 1957.05.09), appointed Archbishop of Belém do Pará
Bishops of Amazonas
 Alberto Gaudêncio Ramos (later Archbishop)(1948.08.30 – 1952.02.16)
 José da Matha de Andrade y Amaral (1941.05.12 – 1948.03.20), appointed Bishop of Niterói (Nictheroy)
 Basilio Manuel Olimpo Pereira, O.F.M. (1925.05.01 – 1941.03.22)
 José Maria Perreira Lara (1924.03.27 – 1924.12.18), appointed Bishop of Santos, São Paulo
 João Irineu Joffily (1916.05.04 – 1924.03.27), appointed Archbishop of Belém do Pará
 Frederico Benício de Souza e Costa (1907.01.08 – 1914.04.16)
 José Lourenço da Costa Aguiar (1894.01.16 – 1905.06.05)

Coadjutor archbishop
Milton Corrêa Pereira (1973-1981)

Auxiliary bishops
Jacson Damasceno Rodrigues, C.SS.R. (1996-1998)
Mário Pasqualotto, P.I.M.E. (1999-2013)
Sebastião Bandeira Coêlho (2004-2010), appointed Coadjutor Bishop of Coroatá, Maranhão
Mário Antônio da Silva (2010-2016), appointed Bishop of Roraima, Roraima
José Albuquerque de Araújo (2016-
Edmilson Tadeu Canavarros dos Santos, S.D.B. (2016-

Suffragan dioceses
 Diocese of Alto Solimões
 Diocese of Borba
 Diocese of Coari
 Territorial Prelature of Itacoatiara
 Diocese of Parintins
 Diocese of Roraima
 Diocese of São Gabriel da Cachoeira
 Territorial Prelature of Tefé

Sources

 GCatholic.org
 Catholic Hierarchy
  Archdiocese website (Portuguese)

Roman Catholic dioceses in Brazil
Roman Catholic ecclesiastical provinces in Brazil
 
Religious organizations established in 1892
Roman Catholic dioceses and prelatures established in the 19th century